Simon Richard Clarke (born 28 September 1984) is a British politician who served as Secretary of State for Levelling Up, Housing and Communities from September to October 2022 and Chief Secretary to the Treasury from 2021 to 2022. A member of the Conservative Party, he has been Member of Parliament (MP) for Middlesbrough South and East Cleveland since 2017.

Following Boris Johnson's appointment as Prime Minister, Clarke was appointed Exchequer Secretary to the Treasury. He served as Minister of State for Regional Growth and Local Government from February to September 2020. In the 2021 cabinet reshuffle he was returned to Government as Chief Secretary to the Treasury, becoming the youngest cabinet minister in the ministry. After Johnson resigned in 2022, Clarke supported Liz Truss's bid to become Conservative leader. Following Truss's appointment as Prime Minister, he was appointed Secretary of State for Levelling Up, Housing and Communities, a post he held until his resignation prior to the accession of Rishi Sunak to the Prime Ministership.

Early life 
Clarke was born in North Tees Hospital and grew up in the suburb of Marton, Teesside. His parents Richard and Jill Clarke were a solicitor and stay-at-home mother. He was privately educated at Red House School in Norton, before going on to study History at University College, Oxford. At university, he was chairman of the Oxford University Conservative Association in Trinity Term, 2006.

After leaving university he moved to London and trained as a solicitor with Slaughter and May before going to work in 2010 for the Surrey-based Conservative MP Dominic Raab, and then the Yorkshire-based Conservative MP Graham Stuart.

Political career
Clarke unsuccessfully stood as the Conservative candidate for the Middlesbrough constituency at the 2015 general election, coming third and suffering a swing against his party of 2.3%. Whilst being employed as a Policy Advisor to the Conservative MP Graham Stuart, he was selected as the candidate for Middlesbrough South and East Cleveland in April 2017. He was elected at the 2017 general election, winning the seat from Labour after the sitting MP Tom Blenkinsop stood down.

Clarke has served on the Treasury Committee, the Treasury Sub-Committee and the Regulatory Reform Committee. He clashed with both the then-Labour MP for Redcar and the Labour-run Middlesbrough Council over plans for transport improvements in the local area, while he argued against his own party's opposition to onshore windfarms.

On 12 June 2019 the UK Government amended the Climate Change Act 2008 by introducing a target for a 100% reduction of greenhouse gas emissions (compared to 1990 levels) in the UK by 2050. At the forefront of this change in policy was Clarke, who, in September 2018, organised a letter signed by more than 130 cross-party MPs which indicated their support for net zero emissions and stressed opportunities for UK businesses, including in the North East.

On 27 July 2019 he was appointed Exchequer Secretary to the Treasury in Boris Johnson's government. On 13 February 2020 he was appointed Minister of State for Regional Growth and Local Government. Clarke has been an advocate of regeneration both locally and nationally. In his role, he said that towns and coastal communities had not shared the benefits of the economic growth experienced in other parts of the UK. He said he supported regenerative measures undertaken by private initiatives in his constituency such as the reopening and expanding of Teesside International Airport, alongside the Tees Valley Mayor's plans to redevelop the SSI steelworks site. He remained Minister for Regional Growth and Local Government until 8 September 2020, when he resigned for personal reasons.

In a cabinet reshuffle on 15 September 2021, Clarke succeeded Steve Barclay in the Cabinet-attending post of Chief Secretary to the Treasury.

On 6 September 2022, Clarke was appointed Secretary of State for Levelling Up, Housing and Communities. He resigned from the role on 25 October 2022, prior to the accession of Rishi Sunak to the Prime Ministership.

In December 2022, Clarke made an amendment to the Levelling Up Bill to ease planning rules for onshore wind farms in England which was signed by 34 Conservative MPs—including former Prime Ministers Boris Johnson and Liz Truss. As a result of a threatened rebellion led by Clarke, the Government said that a rule requiring new turbines to be built on pre-designated land would be rewritten.

Political views
Clarke is a strong supporter of Brexit, having voted for the UK to leave the European Union, and is a supporter of the Eurosceptic campaign Leave Means Leave. He called the new Brexit deal secured by Boris Johnson "marvellous news", stating that the "anti-democratic backstop" had been abolished. He was critical of the negotiating approach taken by Theresa May and had submitted a call for a vote of no confidence in her leadership.

On 6 June 2022, after a vote of no confidence in the leadership of Boris Johnson was called, Clarke announced that he would be supporting the Prime Minister, praising his leadership on Brexit, the COVID-19 pandemic and the war in Ukraine, adding: "He has won every major election he has fought because he is a politician with the capacity both to inspire and to deliver."

Personal life 
Clarke lives in the town of Guisborough, Teesside, and London.

His height, makes him Britain's second-tallest MP and earned him the nickname "Stilts" at school.

Prior to the 2021 autumn budget, Clarke said he would not take part in the traditional publicity photo with the Chancellor of the Exchequer as he suffers from agoraphobia.

Honours

 He was sworn in as a member of the Privy Council of the United Kingdom on 20 September 2021 at Balmoral Castle. This gave him the honorific prefix "The Right Honourable" for life.

References

External links

|-

1984 births
Living people
Conservative Party (UK) MPs for English constituencies
People from Stockton-on-Tees
Alumni of University College, Oxford
People educated at Yarm School
Presidents of the Oxford University Conservative Association
UK MPs 2017–2019
UK MPs 2019–present
British Secretaries of State
Members of the Privy Council of the United Kingdom
Chief Secretaries to the Treasury
British Eurosceptics